Elisabeth Arnold (born 1959 in Ottawa) was an Ottawa City Councillor who represented Somerset Ward from 1994 to 2003. One of her accomplishments on council was spearheading the rebuilding of the Plant Recreation Centre.

Arnold graduated from Lisgar Collegiate Institute and earned a Bachelor's Degree in Geography from Simon Fraser University and a Master's in Urban Planning from Queen's University.

From 1979 to 1984 she was a member of the Canadian national canoe team. From 1986 to 1988 she was the coordinator for Housing Help, which provided help for people in regard to housing needs. From 1989 to 1992 she was the coordinator of the Community Development Program at the Sandy Hill Community Health Centre. She also has worked with a number of volunteer groups.

During the 1993 federal election, Arnold was the affirmative action coordinator for the New Democratic Party.

She ran for the Ontario New Democratic Party in the 1999 provincial election in Ottawa Centre. She won nearly 12,000 votes, 6,000 behind winner Richard Patten of the Liberals.

Arnold is now the Director for the Centre for Sustainable Community Development at the Federation of Canadian Municipalities.

References

Ottawa city councillors
1959 births
Ontario New Democratic Party candidates in Ontario provincial elections
Living people
Women municipal councillors in Canada
Women in Ontario politics
20th-century Canadian politicians
20th-century Canadian women politicians
21st-century Canadian politicians
21st-century Canadian women politicians